Cœuvres-et-Valsery is a commune in the Aisne department in Hauts-de-France in northern France. The town is in the Arrondissement of Soissons.

History
The commune of Cœuvres was created during the French Revolution. On 29 May 1830 it was abolished by ordinance and merged with the adjoining commune of Valsery. The new entity takes the name of Cœuvres-et-Valsery.

Until its merger with Valsery in 1845, the town was part of the canton of Vic-sur-Aisne in the department of Aisne. It also belonged to the district of Soissons since 1801 and the district of Soissons between 1790 and 1795.

Valsery Abbey (Abbaye Notre-Dame de Valsery) was a Premonstratensian monastery of the Diocese of Soissons, that used to be in the town.

Population

See also
 Communes of the Aisne department

References

Communes of Aisne
Aisne communes articles needing translation from French Wikipedia